Muzz Buzz is an Australian owned and operated drive-through coffee franchise chain, originating in Perth, Western Australia. Established in 2001, in the suburb of Belmont, Muzz Buzz has seen rapid expansion in recent years and be found at over 35 locations within the Perth metropolitan area.

History
Craig Muzeroll opened the first Muzz Buzz in 2001 on Great Eastern Highway, Belmont, Western Australia. The coffee shop was created to cater to a growing Australian tastes for premium coffee which was, at the time, not commonly available within Perth in drive-through form.

Franchising of the brand commenced in 2004 after Warren Reynolds and his partners purchased Craig Muzeroll's business. The first franchised outlet was established in Mosman Park. Reynolds was instrumental in the expansion of the franchise to additional Perth locations. Sporting a distinctive design, reminiscent of an oversized coffee cup, the stores have the standard corporate livery of white, green, and purple.

Expansion into non-Western Australian markets began in 2006, with potential sites earmarked in New South Wales, South Australia, Queensland and Victoria. , Muzz Buzz had 56 operating drive-through outlets in four Australian states. Internationally, franchise rights have been sold to Belarus for the Eastern Bloc, Turkey and the Middle East, South Africa, New Zealand (two stores), United Kingdom and Singapore, with advanced negotiations ongoing for future North American based operations. Additionally, Reynolds has mentioned in interviews that the company has received expressions of interest from China.

Muzz Buzz is a member of the Franchise Council of Australia, and was ranked as one of the top 10 franchises within Australia in 2012, based on an independent review of franchisors by 10 Thousand Feet.

Controversy 
An advertisement by Muzz Buzz in 2016 had received complaints from viewers who pointed out that it "promot[ed] paedophilia and abusive behaviour". The advertisement shows a man pouring juice over a young boy, wiping it off with his finger, licking his finger and saying "delicious sticky boy". The ad was criticised as “violent, messy, and disgusting”. In response, Muzz Buzz removed the advertisement from all broadcasts and apologised to the public for “any distress caused”.

See also

 List of coffeehouse chains
 List of restaurant chains in Australia

References

External links

 Muzz Buzz Japan 

Fast-food franchises
Coffeehouses and cafés in Australia
Companies based in Perth, Western Australia